Lars Martin Myhre (born 10 August 1956 in Tønsberg, Norway) is a Norwegian composer, guitarist, pianist, singer and producer residing in Sandefjord. He is best known for his collaboration with Odd Børretzen, but has for more than 30 years been involved in the musical life of Norway and has released a dozen albums, participated in or produced albums for other artists and composed film music, musicals and theater music. He has visited a variety of music genres such as jazz, show and classical music.

Career 
At the start of his career he was an active jazz musician. For one he started Slagen Big Band in 1977 and was conductor of the band for 10 years. With the SBB, he released the album Bak speilet with lyrics by Jens Bjørneboe in 1984. From 1980 until 1993, he was musical director for the group Friteater Thesbiteateret. In this period he wrote music to more than twenty plays and two musicals, namely Nattklubben in 1987 and Oppdagelsen av Columbus together with Odd Børretzen in 1992.

He has written music for feature films Henrys bakværelse directed by Gianni Lepre in 1982 and Prinsen av Fogo directed by Inge Tenvik in 1987, and the documentary Å seile sin egen sjø av Øyvind Sandberg in 2002. He has also written music for several short films and commissioned films.

In 1981, he started the successful collaboration with Odd Børretzen and together they have released three albums. Their first album Noen ganger er det all right which appeared in 1995, was less than 98 weeks VG-lista and has sold about 150,000 copies. It is the first album out of a trilogy. The duo have been rewarded Spellemannprisen four times, including one-time price ever Norwegian hit for the song Noen ganger er det all right. At the same time Myhre a project of his own.

In the 1980s, he started a partnership with the poet and singer Arild Nyquist. The collaboration resulted among others in the group Trio Tre where Svein Olav Blindheim was the third person. They released the album Kalde øl og heite jenter (Cold beer and hot girls) in 1985 and I sans og samling (In a stupor) in 1999. When Myhre composed the work Havet – reise til verdens ende (Sea – travel to the end of the world) his starting point was the poem Havet by Nyquist. The work was premiered at Vestfoldspillene in 1993.

To the Vestfoldspillene in 1997, he created the commissioned work Hysj together with the poet Gro Dahle. Hysj was also released on a record with the Danish Jazz trumpeter Palle Mikkelborg as soloist, and published in both Norwegian version and English by the name Hush. In addition to Mikkelborg, renowned jazz musicians like Joanna Foster, Jonathan Guy Lewis and Kvitretten participated. The album was nominated to Spellemannprisen the following year.

In 2001, Myhre released the album 10 sanger where he set music to poems by, among others Ingvar Hovland and Jens Bjørneboe. Basically he wanted to find different vocalist's to sing the different songs, but ended up singing all of them himself. The collaboration with Hovland continued and in 2006 with the album Stengetid? ten lyrical pieces by Hovland.

Awards and honors 
 Urijazzprisen 1984
 Sem Sparebanks Culture Prize 1985
 Vestfold fylkeskommunes Kunstnerpris 1989
 First prize NOPA/NRK summer song competition 1995 for En sommer er aldri over (with lyricist Louis Jacoby)
 Spellemannprisen 1996 in the class song of the Year for «Noen ganger er det all right» (with Odd Børretzen)
 Spellemannprisen 1997 in the class folk rock for the album Vintersang (with Odd Børretzen)
 Kardemomme grant NOPA 1999
 Tidenens norske hit under Spellemannprisen 2001 for Noen ganger er det all right (with Odd Børretzen)
 Årets Norsktopplåt 2001 for «Deja-vu» (from 10 sanger''')
 Sandefjord municipal Culture Prize 2002
 Spellemannprisen 2002 in the class folk songs for the album Kelner! (with Odd Børretzen)
 Gammleng-prisen 2005 i klassen viser

 Discography 
 Søstrene (EMREC, 1983), single, wit Slagen Storband. Lyrics by Jens Bjørneboe
 Bak speilet (Hot Club Records, 1984) sammen med Slagen Storband. Tekster av Jens Bjørneboe
 Kalde øl og heite jenter (Tunsberg, 1985) Trio Tre album
 Slemme Lars og noen andre (Tunsberg, 1987), children's music, with Arild Nyquist og Svein Olav Blindheim
 Sanger fra ei kjerre (1992) with Thesbiteateret
 Noen ganger er det all right (Tylden, 1995) sammen med Odd Børretzen
 Vintersang  (Tylden, 1997) with Odd Børretzen
 Hysj  (Tylden, 1997)
 I sans og samling (Tylden, 1999) Trio Tre album
 Hush (1999) Engelish version of Hysj 10 Sanger (Tylden, 2001)
 Kelner! (Tylden, 2002) with Odd Børretzen
 Fra øverste hylle (Tylden, 2004) with Odd Børretzen – compilation
 Stengetid? (Tylden, 2006)
 Syv sørgelige sanger og tre triste (2008) with Odd Børretzen
 Sibelius' åttende – eller så langt vi har reist for å komme til kort (Bigbox / Sony Music, 2011)
 Hans Majestet'' (Gramofon, 2016)

See also 
Music of Norway

References

External links 
 Official Website
 Discographyi and an overview of other work at Tylden (in Norwegian)

Norwegian composers
Norwegian male composers
Norwegian male pianists
Norwegian folk singers
Norwegian male singers
Norwegian folk guitarists
Norwegian male guitarists
Hot Club Records artists
Spellemannprisen winners
Musicians from Tønsberg
1956 births
Living people
21st-century pianists
21st-century Norwegian male musicians